Maaja Ranniku (born 1 March 1941 in Abja-Paluoja - died 24 October 2004 in Tallinn) was an Estonian chess player (represented the Soviet Union until 1991).

She was twice the winner of the Women's Soviet Championship: in 1963 (after beating at tiebreak Tatiana Zatulovskaya 4-2) and 1967.

She was awarded the title of Woman International Master in 1964.

Maaja Ranniku participated to many Estonian Championships, winning the women's title 10 times (1961, 1963, 1967, 1973, 1981, 1982, 1984, 1987, 1988, and 1991).

At the 1964 women's Candidates Tournament, played in Sukhumi, she placed 6th in a field of 18 players.

In 1992 she played with the Estonian team at the 30th Chess Olympiad in Manila, scoring 6½ points out of 11 games played.

She had many good results in international tournaments:
 1969 : first place at Budapest
 1971 : first place at Braşov
 1973 : second place at Vrnjačka Banja
 1978 : third place at the women's zonal tournament in Frunze

A photograph of her is published here.

References

External links
 Biography (in Estonian)
 

1941 births
2004 deaths
Estonian female chess players
Soviet female chess players
Chess Woman International Masters
20th-century chess players